The list of shipwrecks in 1905 includes ships sunk, foundered, grounded, or otherwise lost during 1905.

January

1 January

2 January

3 January

10 January

12 January

13 January

14 January

15 January

16 January

17 January

18 January

21 January

22 January

24 January

25 January

26 January

27 January

28 January

29 January

31 January

Unknown date

February

4 February

5 February

7 February

9 February

10 February

12 February

16 February

17 February

18 February

22 February

25 February

27 February

Unknown date

March

2 March

3 March

5 March

6 March

9 March

13 March

14 March

18 March

19 March

25 March

26 March

27 March

29 March

30 March

31 March

April

3 April

4 April

6 April

7 April

8 April

10 April

12 April

15 April

16 April

19 April

20 April

22 April

Unknown date

May

1 May

3 May

4 May

5 May

7 May

9 May

11 May

12 May

13 May

14 May

15 May

16 May

18 May

25 May

27 May

28 May

29 May

30 May

31 May

Unknown date

June

1 June

2 June

5 June

7 June

8 June

10 June

13 June

15 June

17 June

18 June

20 June

21 June

22 June

23 June

24 June

25 June

26 June

30 June

Unknown date

July

1 July

2 July

3 July

4 July

5 July

8 July

11 July

13 July

14 July

15 July

17 July

18 July

19 July

21 July

22 July

24 July

25 July

26 July

27 July

28 July

29 July

30 July

August

2 August

4 August

5 August

6 August

7 August

8 August

10 August

11 August

12 August

13 August

14 August

15 August

16 August

17 August

19 August

20 August

21 August

22 August

23 August

24 August

25 August

26 August

27 August

28 August

29 August

31 August

Unknown date

September

1 September

2 September

3 September

4 September

5 September

7 September

9 September

11 September

12 September

13 September

15 September

18 September

19 September

20 September

21 September

22 September

24 September

25 September

26 September

27 September

28 September

30 September

Unknown date

October

1 October

2 October

4 October

5 October

6 October

7 October

8 October

10 October

11 October

12 October

13 October

14 October

15 October

16 October

17 October

18 October

19 October

20 October

22 October

23 October

24 October

25 October

26 October

28 October

30 October

31 October

Unknown date

November

1 November

2 November

3 November

4 November

5 November

7 November

8 November

9 November

10 November

12 November

13 November

14 November

15 November

16 November

17 November

18 November

20 November

21 November

22 November

23 November

24 November

25 November

27 November

28 November

29 November

30 November

Unknown date

December

1 December

2 December

3 December

4 December

5 December

6 December

7 December

8 December

10 December

11 December

12 December

13 December

14 December

15 December

16 December

17 December

19 December

20 December

21 December

23 December

24 December

25 December

26 December

27 December

28 December

29 December

31 December

Unknown date

Unknown date

References

1905
 
Ship